Fishing Creek is a  tributary of Bald Eagle Creek in Clinton County, Pennsylvania, in the United States.

Fishing Creek passes through a water gap in Bald Eagle Mountain at Mill Hall, and joins Bald Eagle Creek near the borough of Flemington.

The Logan Mills Gristmill was powered by water from Fishing Creek and the Logan Mills Covered Bridge spans Fishing Creek at Logan Township in Clinton County, Pennsylvania.

See also
List of rivers of Pennsylvania

References

External links
U.S. Geological Survey: PA stream gaging stations

Rivers of Pennsylvania
Tributaries of the West Branch Susquehanna River
Rivers of Clinton County, Pennsylvania